Good Intentions is the third studio album by Canadian rapper Nav. It was released on May 8, 2020, by XO Records and Republic Records. It follows his second  studio album, Bad Habits, which was released in 2019. The album features guest appearances from Young Thug, Future, Gunna, Travis Scott, Lil Uzi Vert, Pop Smoke, Don Toliver, and Lil Durk. The re-release of the album, titled Brown Boy 2, the deluxe edition and a sequel to his 2019 unofficial Brown Boy EP, was released three days later, on May 11, 2020. It features additional guest appearances from Quavo and Lil Duke.

The album was met with mixed reviews from contemporary critics. At the aggregate site Metacritic, which assigns a normalized rating out of 100 to reviews from professional publications, the album received an average score of 54, based on 4 reviews, indicating “Mixed or Average Reviews”.

Background
On April 27, 2020, Nav announced the follow-up to his sophomore studio album, Bad Habits, which was released on March 22, 2019. Alongside the announcement, he revealed the album's trailer with teased potential features from American rappers Lil Uzi Vert and the late Pop Smoke, showing clips of him talking to both rappers.

Singles
The album's lead single, "Turks" with Gunna featuring Travis Scott, was released for digital download on March 27, 2020. The song was produced by Wheezy. The music video was released on March 30, 2020. The music video was directed by Nav's manager Cash, who also co-wrote the song, and Zac Facts. The song peaked at number 45 on the Billboard Canadian Hot 100. The song also peaked at number 17 on the Billboard Hot 100, making it Nav's highest-charting song both as a lead or, at the time of the song’s release, featured artist.

Commercial performance
Good Intentions debuted at number one on the US Billboard 200 chart, earning 135,000 album-equivalent units (including 73,000 copies as pure album sales) in its first week. This became Nav's second US number-one album. The album also accumulated a total of 84.8 million on-demand streams of the album's songs during the tracking week. In its second week, the album dropped to number ten on the chart, earning an additional 35,000 units.

In his home country of Canada, the album debuted at number one on the Canadian Albums Chart, earning 10,000 album-equivalent units in its first week. This became Nav's second number-one debut on the chart.

Track listing
Credits adapted from Tidal, and Nav's Instagram for the deluxe edition.

Credits adapted from Tidal.

Notes
  signifies a co-producer
  signifies an additional producer
  signifies an uncredited co-producer
 "Bag" contains additional vocals by Corbin

Personnel
All programming and keyboards are credited to the producers of each track.

 Ethan Stevens – engineering 
 Raphael Mesquita – recording assistant 
 Pro Logic – mixing , uncredited engineering 
 Mike Dean – uncredited mixing 
 Colin Leonard – mastering

Charts

Weekly charts

Year-end charts

References

2020 albums
Nav (rapper) albums
Republic Records albums
Albums produced by Nav (rapper)
Albums produced by Cardo
Albums produced by DJ Mustard
Albums produced by JetsonMade
Albums produced by Tay Keith
Albums produced by Wheezy